Kurumbapatti is a village in Karur district in the Indian state of Tamil Nadu.

Demographics
A village with around 350 homes and 1000 people. mostly depending on agriculture. Sri Bagavathi amman and Sri Muthaalamman temple are best known. It has one high school, and a primary school.

References

Villages in Karur district